Vahram Papazian or Papazyan (January 6, 1888 in Constantinople, Ottoman Empire – June 5, 1968 in Yerevan, Armenia), was a Soviet actor who was an ethnic Armenian, mostly known for his Shakespearean roles. Vahram had done plays in Constantinople, Tiflis, Baku Armenian theaters, Moscow's Maly Theatre and in France, Italy, Austria, Spain, and Belgium.  Papazian began his career in 1908, where he was regarded as one of the best Armenian actors at the time. Before his death he was known as the leading star in the Sundukyan Academic Theatre. The Council of National Literature's wrote that 'Vahram Papazian's Othello dominated the Armenian stage for more than half a century'.

In 1933, Rezā Shāh decided to create the National State Theatre Company and invited Vahram Papazian to cast a number of shows for the Iranian Red Cross.

Legacy
Vahram Papazian is buried at Komitas Pantheon which is located in the city center of Yerevan.

A statue of Papazian was erected in Armenia on February 5, 2012.

Vahram Papazian Theatre Group
A Lebanese Armenian theatre group, founded by the Armenian General Benevolent Union's (AGBU, Armenian:ՀԲԸՄ) Armenian Youth Association (Armenian: ՀԵԸ), is named after Vahram Papazian.

See also 
List of People's Artists of the Azerbaijan SSR

References

External links

1888 births
1968 deaths
People's Artists of Armenia
Ethnic Armenian male actors
Soviet Armenians
Soviet male actors
People's Artists of the USSR
Male actors from Istanbul
Armenians from the Ottoman Empire
Burials at the Komitas Pantheon
Emigrants from the Ottoman Empire to the Russian Empire